The Norwegian First Division, also called 1. divisjon and OBOS-ligaen (named sponsor is property developer OBOS), is the second-highest level of the Norwegian football league system. Each year, the top finishing teams in the 1. divisjon are promoted to the Eliteserien, and the lowest finishing teams are relegated to 2. divisjon.

1. divisjon was previously known as 2. divisjon (1963–1990) and replaced regional league Landsdelsserien (1951–1962) after the latter was dissolved after the 1961–62 season. The second tier was also prior to Landsdelsserien known as 1. divisjon (1948–1951). Formally, it was a semi-professional league. The tier has been restructured many times and consists of 16 teams at present.

History
Between 1963 and 1990, the second highest level in Norwegian football was named 2. divisjon. In 1991, due to rebranding of the top flight level in 1990, it was renamed to its initial name; 1. divisjon. 1. divisjon has been the name of this level ever since, except for periods when the league has had a sponsor-affiliated name. Between 2005 and 2013 the level was known as Adeccoligaen and from 2015 to 2020 the name is OBOS-ligaen.

Format

Previous
In the 1997 season, 1. divisjon merged from two divisions consisting of 12 teams each, to only one with 14 teams. In the 2001 season, 1. divisjon expanded from 14 to 16 teams. Only two teams were relegated in the 2000 season. In 2009, the number of teams in Eliteserien expanded from 14 to 16. Therefore, only one team was relegated to 1. divisjon, whilst three teams were promoted to Tippeligaen.

Current
Since 2012 four teams, finishing 3rd to 6th, has qualified for promotion play-offs. In the 2017 season the relegation format was changed. The previous format where four teams were relegated was replaced with a format with two relegation spots and one relegation play-off spot.

The league is contested by 16 teams. During the course of a season, each club plays the others twice, home and away, for a total of 30 games for each club, and a total of 240 games in a season. The season starts in April and lasts until early November. The top two teams will be promoted to Eliteserien, while the teams placed from third to sixth place will play a promotion-playoff against each other to earn the right to play a two-legged game against the 14th-placed team in Eliteserien to win promotion. The bottom two teams will be relegated to the 2. divisjon known as PostNord-ligaen, and the team in 14th place will play a two-legged playoff against the play-off winner among the two-second-placed teams in 2. divisjon.

Changes in competition format

Clubs

Current members

The following 16 clubs are competing in the 2023 Norwegian First Division:

Sponsorship 
Ahead of the 2015 season, a six-year deal was agreed with the housing cooperative OBOS. In the period from 2015 to 2020, 1. divisjon will be named OBOS-ligaen.

1. divisjon has a number of official partners and suppliers. The official ball supplier for the league is Umbro who on 20 February 2020 signed the first ever contract to deliver official balls for OBOS-ligaen. The two-year deal began from the start of the 2020 season.

Statistics 

From 1963 to 1990, the second tier in Norwegian football was named 2. divisjon. Until 1996, the 1. divisjon teams was split in two groups. This statistics shows the winning cubs, runners-ups, play-off teams, top goal scorer and the league's average attendances starting with the first one-group 1. divisjon season in 1997. Teams in bold won the promotion play-offs and were promoted to Eliteserien.

References

External links

1.division summary(SOCCERWAY)
 1. Division 2015 season results, fixtures and league table at Soccerway
 First division 2015 by round/date, at RSSSF

 
2
1963 establishments in Norway
Norway
Professional sports leagues in Norway